The 1924 United States Senate election in Nebraska took place on November 4, 1924. The incumbent Republican, George W. Norris, was re-elected by a wide margin to a third term. He defeated John J. Thomas. Norris overperformed Calvin Coolidge, who won the state with 47.09% in the presidential election.

Democratic primary

Candidates
Trenmore Cone, former Clerk of the Nebraska House of Representatives
John J. Thomas, Democratic candidate for Nebraska's 4th district in 1906

Results

Republican primary

Candidates
Fred G. Johnson, lieutenant governor of Nebraska
George W. Norris, the incumbent Senator
Charles Henry Sloan, former Representative for Nebraska's 4th district

Results

Results

References 

1924
Nebraska
United States Senate